Ruben Christopher Carter (born December 1, 1992) is an American football center for the Massachusetts Pirates of the National Arena League (NAL). He played college football at Florida State and Toledo. He signed with the Miami Dolphins as an undrafted free agent in 2016.

He has also been a member of the Dallas Cowboys, Pittsburgh Steelers, and the Calgary Stampeders of the Canadian Football League.

Professional career

Miami Dolphins
On April 30, 2016, Carter signed with the Miami Dolphins as an undrafted free agent. Carter was waived by the Dolphins on August 27, 2016.

Calgary Stampeders
On October 7, 2016, Carter signed with the Calgary Stampeders of the Canadian Football League as a member of the practice roster.

Dallas Cowboys
On May 24, 2017, Carter signed with the Dallas Cowboys. He was waived on August 15, 2017.

Pittsburgh Steelers
On August 25, 2017, Carter signed with the Pittsburgh Steelers. He was waived on September 2, 2017.

Baltimore Brigade
On March 20, 2018, Carter was assigned to the Baltimore Brigade. On March 30, 2018, he was placed on reassignment.

Orlando Apollos
Carter signed with the Orlando Apollos of the Alliance of American Football for the 2019 season.

References

1992 births
Living people
Players of American football from Florida
American football offensive linemen
Miami Dolphins players
Calgary Stampeders players
Dallas Cowboys players
Pittsburgh Steelers players
Baltimore Brigade players
Montreal Alouettes players
Florida State Seminoles football players
Toledo Rockets football players
Orlando Apollos players
Massachusetts Pirates players